Stolen Life, also known as Life and Death Plunder, is a 2005 Chinese drama film directed by Li Shaohong , and starring Zhou Xun and Wu Jun. It was released on April 23, 2005. The only thing that Li Shaohong's shattering that film has in common with Baober in Love is that both star Zhou Xun. The film had won the Best Narrative Feature at the 2005 Tribeca Film Festival, it is an official selection of the prestigious, award-winning Global Lens Collection, presented by the Global Film Initiative.

Plots
In Li Shaohong's acclaimed coming-of-age drama, a teenage girl is taken to live with her aunt and grandmother in Beijing. Yan'ni (played by acclaimed Chinese actress Zhou Xun) is withdrawn and reclusive, believing that she has been abandoned by her parents and has no control over her fate. The fact that her extended family doesn't have much hope for her future only compounds her depression. Surprising everyone in her hostile household, Yan'ni  is accepted to college. But as she prepares to embark on her new life of higher education, an encounter with a delivery boy triggers a series of unexpected events that will change her life forever.

Cast
 Zhou Xun as Yan'ni
 When Yan'ni decides not to kill Muyu, Xiaoping Lin, author of Children of Marx and Coca-Cola: Chinese Avant-Garde Art and Independent Cinema, states that she made "a triumph of a common humanity that finally sets her free from Muyu's shadow and its dark future."
 Wu Jun as Muyu
 Muyu's parents were not married and therefore he was born out of wedlock. Muyu makes money from his deceptive romantic relationships. Xiaoping Lin compared Muyu to Lenox Sanderson of Way Down East. According to Xiaoping Lin, the film does not state that Muyu ever faces adverse consequences.
 Cai Ming 
 Su Xiaoming 
 Peiyi Wang
 Jianong Sun
 Yan Ni as Sichuan woman

Awards and nominations

Reception
Janice Page of the Boston Globe wrote that "This one hits home in places, but overall it begs for a lighter touch."

References

External links
 
 

2005 romantic drama films
2005 films
Chinese romantic drama films